Trudeau government or Trudeau cabinet may refer to:
20th Canadian Ministry, led by Pierre Trudeau from 1968 to 1979
22nd Canadian Ministry, led by Pierre Trudeau from 1980 to 1984
29th Canadian Ministry, led by Justin Trudeau

See also
Premiership of Pierre Trudeau
Premiership of Justin Trudeau